Wasser means "Water" in German. It may refer to:

People 
 Anna Waser (1678–1714), Swiss painter
 Annemarie Waser (born 1940), Swiss alpine skier
 Ed Wasser (born 1964), actor
 Edgar Wasser (born 1990), German musician
 Joan Wasser, musician
 Laura Wasser (born 1968), attorney
 Markus Wasser (born 1968), bobsledder
 Thierry Wasser, contemporary perfumer

Places 
 Wasser, Germany, a village

Other uses
 Wasser- und Schifffahrtsamt, a regional German agency responsible for the administration of federal navigable waters 
 Wasser- und Zugvogelreservate, several bird reserves in Switzerland
 Wasser im Wind, album by keyboardist Hans-Joachim Roedelius

See also 
 Vasser
 Waser
 Wassermann (disambiguation)

German words and phrases
German-language surnames